Mademoiselle Chambon is a 2009 French film directed by Stéphane Brizé, with a screenplay adapted from the 1996 novel by Éric Holder. It won a César Award for Best Adaptation.

Cast
 Sandrine Kiberlain as Véronique Chambon
 Vincent Lindon as Jean
 Aure Atika as Anne-Marie, wife of Jean
 Jean-Marc Thibault as Father of Jean 
 Bruno Lochet as Jean's Colleague

Critical response
British film critic Mark Kermode praised the film and the performances of the lead actors. "Should he abandon the wife with whom he has built a home to pursue a fleeting dream inspired in part by the strange reverie of Elgar's Salut d'Amour?   Eloquently adapted from Eric Holder's novel, this low-key, César-winning gem relies on tiny gestures – a glance, a wry smile, a longing look – to suggest great passion and inner turmoil, all conjured with wit, grace and honesty by Lindon and Kiberlain. Comparing any movie with Brief Encounter is always going to end in tears – Yet director Stéphane Brizé's quietly tremendous Mademoiselle Chambon does a pretty good job of reminding us that in terms of tragic romantic clout, less is often more."

Awards and nominations
The film was nominated for the Independent Spirit Award for Best Foreign Film in 2010.  

It was awarded a César Award for Best Adaptation.

References

External links

2009 films
2009 drama films
French drama films
Films directed by Stéphane Brizé
Films based on French novels
2000s French films